Dreams of a Cryotank is Covenant's debut full-length album. It was released in December 1994 by Memento Materia. For all USA releases, the track list was altered slightly. The first USA release was in 1997, and the subsequent re-release by Metropolis Records in 1999.

A limited collector's edition on vinyl records was re-released in 2012.

Track listing
All tracks by Joakim Montelius & Eskil Simonsson except where noted #

Notes
 The original version of the album does not include the club edit of "Theremin". 
 The original release has "Void" as the fourth track; the American releases replace it with "Painamplifier". 
 American versions have "Edge of Dawn" marked as "mix", suggesting an alternate mix.
 The band Edge of Dawn named after the song with the same name.

Personnel 

 Eskil Simonsson – lead vocals, lead composition, engineering, production, synths
 Joakim Montelius – composition, production, synths, backing vocals
 Clas Nachmanson – engineering, production, synths, backing vocals

References

1994 debut albums
Covenant (band) albums
Metropolis Records albums